Frame running, previously known as RaceRunning, is an adaptive athletic discipline, primarily for people with severe coordination and balance impairments such as cerebral palsy. Athletes use a three-wheeled running frame, with a saddle, body support and most notably, no pedals. Athletes run over distances similar to other track and road running disciplines; 100, 200, 400, 800 meters as well as 5 kilometers, 10 kilometers, half and full marathons. Like running more generally, frame running can be competitive, recreational, or for health and fitness.

Frame running was created in Denmark in 1991 by Paralympian Connie Hansen and Mansoor Siddiqi, a former CP2L backwards wheelchair foot pushing athlete and currently the international frame running coordinator. It has since been developed in partnership with the Cerebral Palsy International Sports and Recreation Association.

In 1997, the first frame running development camp and cup was held in Copenhagen, Denmark. This became an annual event. The 25th edition of the Camp and Cup was held in 2022, with athletes from 14 countries represented.

Frame running has been contested at the CPISRA World Games since 2005 , and at the IWAS World Games since 2011.

In 2017, frame running was announced as a World Para Athletics track discipline, alongside ambulant running and wheelchair racing. 100m frame running events were contested at the 2018 and 2021 World Para Athletics European Championships, and at the 2019 World Para Athletics Championships. Frame running was unsuccessfully proposed for inclusion in the 2024 Summer Paralympics. It was, however, included in the program for the 2023 World Para Athletics Championships.

Frame Running clubs exist in countries around the world including the United States, Australia, Portugal, Denmark, Netherlands, the UK, Poland, Lithuania, and others.

References 

Parasports
Para-athletics
Events in track and field